Albert Thomas Moran (January 1, 1912 – January 7, 1998) was a pitcher in Major League Baseball who played from 1938 to 1939 for the Boston Bees.

References

External links

1912 births
1998 deaths
Baseball players from New York (state)
Boston Bees players
Harrisburg Senators players
Hartford Bees players
Hartford Laurels players
Kansas City Blues (baseball) players
Little Rock Travelers players
Major League Baseball pitchers
Milwaukee Brewers (minor league) players
Montreal Royals players
Newark Bears (IL) players
Scranton Miners players
Sportspeople from Rochester, New York
Zanesville Greys players
Burials at Greenridge Cemetery